"Hope & Ruin" is a song by Canadian rock band The Trews. It was the lead single and title track from The Trews' fourth studio album, Hope & Ruin.

Background
According to Colin and John-Angus MacDonald, the song was inspired by the song "Fly" by Nick Drake. The title of the song was taken from the cover of a Rolling Stone magazine released in 2009 after Michael Jackson's death which featured the title "Michael Jackson's Final Days: Hope And Ruin". The original opening lyric of the song was "Hope and Ruin, the American Dream".

Music video
The music video for "Hope & Ruin" was directed by Drew Lightfoot, the same man who directed The Trews' video for "Hold Me In Your Arms" in 2007. The video was shot over 4 days on location in Toronto and rural Nova Scotia.

Charts

References

2011 singles
The Trews songs
2011 songs